Cave of Horror is the nickname given to what archaeologists have catalogued as Nahal Hever Cave 8 (8Hev) of the Judaean Desert, Israel, where the remains of Jewish refugees from the Bar Kokhba revolt (c. 132–136 CE) were found.

Location
The cave lies in the cliffs towering from the south over the wadi known in Hebrew as Nahal Hever. Nearby, in the cliffs on the opposite side of the stream, is the Cave of Letters, where many documents from the Bar Kokhba revolt were uncovered.

Discoveries

Bar Kokhba revolt
At the top of the cliff above the Cave of Horror were the ruins of a Roman camp, similar to the one found above the Cave of Letters. It was used for the Roman siege of the Jews hiding in the cave. Yigael Yadin, excavating the Cave of Horror in 1960, found it to contain fewer ancient remains than the Cave of Letters, since it had already been explored by Bedouins previous to the dig.

The nickname "Cave of Horror" was given after the skeletons of 40 men, women and children were discovered inside. Of the 40 dead the names of three are known, since inscribed potsherds (ostraca) bearing their names were found placed on their remains.

In investigations following the first one by Yadin, a number of fragments of letters and writings were discovered in the cave, among them a number of Bar Kokhba coins and a Greek copy of the biblical Book of the Twelve, an already old scroll by the time it was brought into the cave since it was dated to 50-1 BCE. Some 60 years later, in March 2021, archaeologists discovered new fragments belonging to the same scroll, a Greek translation of the Book of the Twelve, different from the Septuagint and with the name of God, Yahweh, written in Old Hebrew script among the otherwise Greek text. The newly found fragments belong to the Books of Zechariah and Nahum, and contain surprising variations from the Masoretic text commonly used today. No scroll fragments had been discovered by archaeologists in the previous approximately 60 years.

Chalcolithic child burial
The partially mummified 6000-year-old remains of a child, probably a girl aged between 6 and 12, were found in March 2021 under two flat stones in a shallow pit grave with the help of CT (CAT) scan. The burial dates to the Chalcolithic period. The child had been buried in a fetal position and covered with a cloth resembling a small blanket, wrapped around its head and chest, but not its feet. According to the Israel Antiquities Authority the burial was found along with 2,000-year-old Dead Sea scrolls. Fragments were Greek translations of the books of Nahum and Zechariah from the Book of the 12 Minor Prophets. The only text written in Hebrew was the name of God.

See also
 Archaeology of Israel
 List of the Dead Sea Scrolls

References

Further reading
 Y. Yadin, The Search for Bar Kokhba - The Discovery of the Judean Desert Caves and the Letters of the Leader of the Revolt against Rome, Maariv, 1976

Horror
Archaeological sites in Israel
Bar Kokhba revolt
Jews and Judaism in the Roman Empire
Jewish refugees
Dead Sea basin
Judaean Desert